Manek Burj, also spelled Manek Buraj is the foundation bastion of Bhadra Fort in the old city of Ahmedabad, Gujarat, India. The Burj is associated with legendary saint Maneknath.

Etymology

Manek Burj is named after the legendary 15th century Hindu saint, Maneknath, who intervened to help Ahmed Shah I build Bhadra Fort in 1411.

History
Manek Burj was the original bastion of Ahmedabad. It was built around the foundation stone of the city, laid by Ahmed Shah I on 26 February 1411. The well was filled and sealed in 1866 after the Sabarmati river changed its course, causing the Manek Kuva to run dry. A water channel near the bastion once brought water to the royal baths.

In 1869, Ellis Bridge, the city's first bridge across the Sabarmati river, was constructed near the bastion. In May 1989, the Ahmedabad Municipal Corporation declared Ellis bridge and its boundary, Manek Burj, and the natural water drain near one of the banks of the Sabarmati river protected sites.

The original Ellis Bridge was narrow, and not suited for heavy motorized traffic. It was closed in 1997, and in 1999 a new concrete bridge was constructed on either side of the 19th century steel structure. Manek Burj was partially demolished to make way for the bridge expansion.

After the 2001 Gujarat earthquake, and riots in 2002, many believed that the city had suffered as a result of the damage done to the bastion. Manek Burj was restored in 2003.

Culture
Chandan and Rajesh Nath, 13th generation descendants of Saint Maneknath, perform puja and hoist the flag on Manek Burj on Ahmedabad's foundation day and for the Vijayadashami festival every year.

Gallery

References 

Buildings and structures in Ahmedabad
Forts in Gujarat
Tourist attractions in Ahmedabad